Murray Sharp (23 January 1916 – 11 May 1999) was a New Zealand cricketer. He played in four first-class matches for Canterbury from 1934 to 1946.

See also
 List of Canterbury representative cricketers

References

External links
 

1916 births
1999 deaths
New Zealand cricketers
Canterbury cricketers
Cricketers from Gisborne, New Zealand
New Zealand Services cricketers
North Island cricketers